Rostoshi is a rural locality (a selo) and the administrative center of Rostoshinskoye Rural Settlement, Ertilsky District, Voronezh Oblast, Russia. The population was 1,384 as of 2010. There are 22 streets.

Geography 
Rostoshi is located on the Tokay River, 32 km south of Ertil (the district's administrative centre) by road. Ertil is the nearest rural locality.

References 

Rural localities in Ertilsky District